Michurinsky Prospekt is a Moscow Metro station of the Bolshaya Koltsevaya line. It was opened on 7 December 2021 as part of the section between Mnyovniki and Kakhovskaya. A transfer to Michurinsky Prospekt is opened on 7 December 2021.

Gallery

References

Moscow Metro stations
Bolshaya Koltsevaya line
Railway stations located underground in Russia

Railway stations under construction in Russia